Franz Thönnes (born 16 September 1954 in Essen) is a German politician (SPD) who was member of the Bundestag, the German parliament, from 1994 to 2017.

Life 
From 1994 to 2017 Thönnes was a member of the German Bundestag. From November 2000 to January 2001, he was socio-political spokesman and from February 2001 to October 2002, he was deputy chairman of the SPD parliamentary group. Since 2013 he has been the deputy foreign policy spokesman of his parliamentary group. From 2002 to 2005 he was Parliamentary State Secretary to the Federal Minister of Health and Social Security, then Parliamentary State Secretary to the Federal Minister of Labour and Social Affairs until November 2009.

References

External links

 

 

1954 births
Living people
Members of the Bundestag for Schleswig-Holstein
Members of the Bundestag 2013–2017
Members of the Bundestag 2009–2013
Members of the Bundestag 2005–2009
Members of the Bundestag 2002–2005
Members of the Bundestag 1998–2002
Members of the Bundestag 1994–1998
Members of the Bundestag for the Social Democratic Party of Germany
Parliamentary State Secretaries of Germany